Kilimanoor Ramakantan (2 August 1938 – 30 November 2009) was a renowned Malayalam poet, writer, translator and lyricist from Kerala, India. Dante's Divine Comedy was translated into Malayalam by Ramakanthan. This is the first translation of Divine Comedy in India.

Biography
Ramakanthan was born in 1938 in Kilimanoor. Educated at Kilimanoor Rajaraja Varma High School, Thiruvananthapuram Arts College and University College. He worked as a teacher in Sreenarayana College, Kollam for a long time.

Awards
2005 Asan Memorial award for Poetry
Sahithya Academy Award for Best Translation
Mooloor Award Kavitharangam Award
Kavishresta Puraskaram by the Sree Narayana Academi
Velutheri Kesavan Award

Bibliography

Poems and anthology
{{ubl
|Anpathu Premaganangal, songs
|Marmaram
|Kalpantham
|Thrippadangalil [songs]
|Boottasing [Khandakavyam ]
|Kanneerinakkare
|Gurupatham'
|Panthante pattu,
|Kilimanoor ramakanthante Kavithakal,
|Manushyamaramgal,
|Illa,
|Gopalakrishnante Kannukal,
|Iphigenia, Greek Drama
|Thachante Makante Makan
|Jeevithamudra, Khanda Kavyam
|Aro Oral
|Danteyude Nattil, Travel
|Kilimanoor Remakanthante Thiranjedutha kavithakal}}

Books on Kilimanoor Remakanthan
Orma kallukal by K.Indira [ Biography ]
Kilimanoor Remakanthan prakrithiye guruvakkiya kavi written by Malayalapuzha Sudhan { Criticism ]
Prakrithiyude snehagayakan by Nirmala Rajagopal [Biography ]
Kilimanoor Remakanthan [Biography 2 ]
JOTHIR GAMAYA essays edited by DR.D.BENJAMIN

Translations
Kilimanoor's Malayalam translation of Dante's Divine Comedy, published by Kendra Sahithya Academy, was the first translation of the Italian epic into any Indian language. He also translated Nikos Kazantzakis's The Odyssey: A Modern Sequel into Malayalam, where it was published in three parts by Kendra Sahithya Academy under the title Odyssey Aadhunika Anubandham''.

References

External links
The Hindu dated 08/10/2005

Indian male poets
1938 births
Malayalam poets
20th-century Indian poets
Malayalam-language lyricists
Indian lyricists
Poets from Kerala
20th-century Indian male writers
Recipients of the Kerala Sahitya Akademi Award